Elfa Secioria Hasbullah (February 20, 1959 January 8, 2011) was an Indonesian composer and songwriter. He was the founder of teen pop group Elfa's Singers.

Secioria was born in Garut, Indonesia, and died at Pertamina Jaya Hospital, Cempaka Putih, Jakarta due to complications from kidney disease.

References

1961 births
2011 deaths
Sundanese people